{{Infobox album
| name         = 6.0
| type         = studio
| artist       = Sister Machine Gun
| cover        = 60-SMG.jpg
| released     = April 17, 2001
| recorded     = Accelerator
| venue        = 
| studio       = 
| genre        = Industrial rock
| length       = 
| label        = Positron! Records
| producer     = Chris Randall
| prev_title   = Revolution (Sister Machine Gun album)
| year         = 2001
| next_title   = Influence
| next_year    = 2003
}}6.0'' is a studio album by the industrial rock band Sister Machine Gun. It was released in 2001 on Positron! Records.

Track listing
Automaton
Loser
The Best That You Can Do
Never
Machine I
Ten Minute God
Machine II
Gonna Be Right
Down on Me
What I'm Waiting For
Release
Machine III
Machine (No!)
Machine IV
End

References 

2001 albums
Sister Machine Gun albums